Lyn Elizabeth Hamilton (August 6, 1944 – September 10, 2009) was a Canadian author of archaeological mystery novels.

Born to John Hamilton, a lawyer and politician, and Gwen, a librarian, Lyn Hamilton grew up in Etobicoke, Ontario and was educated at the University of Toronto. She worked in communications in the public service and private companies before publishing her first novel at the age of 50. She had been director of Cultural Programs Branch for the province of Ontario and director of public affairs for the Canadian Opera Company. Later, Hamilton taught mystery writing for the School for Continuing Studies of the University of Toronto and served as writer-in-residence for libraries in North York and Kitchener.

Death
She died on September 10, 2009 from cancer, aged 65.

Bibliography
The Lara McClintoch Archaeological Mysteries
The Xibalba Murders (1997)
The Maltese Goddess (1998)
The Moche Warrior (1999)
The Celtic Riddle (2000)
The African Quest (2001)
The Etruscan Chimera (2002)
The Thai Amulet (2003)
The Magyar Venus (2004)
The Moai Murders (2005)
The Orkney Scroll (2006)
The Chinese Alchemist (2007)

Other
Death Dines In (anthology) (2004) - contributed Stark Terror at Tea-time

External links
 Lyn Hamilton's author website
 Crime Writers Canada biography
 Interview with Writers Write

References

1944 births
2009 deaths
Canadian mystery writers
Canadian women novelists
Deaths from cancer in Ontario
People from Etobicoke
Writers from Toronto
University of Toronto alumni
Women mystery writers
20th-century Canadian novelists
21st-century Canadian novelists
20th-century Canadian women writers
21st-century Canadian women writers
Place of birth missing
Place of death missing